The Lone Wolf Returns is a 1935 American crime film starring Melvyn Douglas as jewel thief Michael Lanyard, aka the Lone Wolf. Retired, the Lone Wolf is forced back into crime, but turns the tables on his enemies. It is based on the 1923 Louis Joseph Vance novel The Lone Wolf Returns, which had previously been made into a 1926 film of the same name.

Cast
 Melvyn Douglas as Michael Lanyard
 Gail Patrick as Marcia Stewart
 Tala Birell as Liane Mallison
 Henry Mollison as "Mal" Mallison
 Thurston Hall as Inspector Crane
 Raymond Walburn as Jenkins
 Douglass Dumbrille as Morphew
 Nana Bryant as Aunt Julie Stewart
 Robert Middlemass as Chief of Detectives McGowan
 Robert Emmett O'Connor as Detective Benson

Reception
The New York Times critic Frank Nugent gave the film a poor review, writing, "the time may pass pleasantly enough if this sort of thing is new to you, or if you may be beguiled into a more charitable mood by the performances of Mr. Douglas, Douglas Dumbrille and Raymond Walburn or by the beauty of Gail Patrick and Tala Birell. Speaking for ourselves, we thought the Lone Wolf had picked the wrong night to howl—wrong by fifteen years."

References

External links

American black-and-white films
American crime films
Columbia Pictures films
Films based on American novels
Films directed by Roy William Neill
Films produced by Robert North
1935 crime films
1935 films
Remakes of American films
Sound film remakes of silent films
The Lone Wolf films
1930s American films